Máximo González was the defending champion, but withdrew from the tournament in the quarterfinals.

Mathias Bourgue won the tournament defeating Daniel Muñoz de la Nava in the final, 2–6, 6–4, 6–2.

Seeds

  Máximo González (quarterfinals, withdrew)
  Alejandro González (semifinals)
  Daniel Muñoz de la Nava (final)
  Horacio Zeballos (quarterfinals)
  Gastão Elias (first round)
  Renzo Olivo (quarterfinals)
  Guilherme Clezar (second round)
  Christian Lindell (quarterfinals)

Draw

Finals

Top half

Bottom half

References
 Main Draw
 Qualifying Draw

Internationaux de Tennis de Blois
2015 Singles